About Last Night... is the second studio album by English singer Mabel, released on 15 July 2022 through Polydor Records. It serves as the follow-up to Mabel's debut album, High Expectations (2019). Production of the album took place during the COVID-19 pandemic, with the singer taking inspiration to explore new sounds after watching TV shows such as Pose and RuPaul's Drag Race, while also listening to dance records by Madonna, Whitney Houston and Cece Peniston.

A concept album that follows "the progress of a party, from arrival through romantic tension to break-up and final redemption", About Last Night... mixes synth-pop, disco, house and R&B with themes of love, empowerment and confidence. It was supported by the release of the singles "Let Them Know", "Good Luck" with Jax Jones & Galantis and "Overthinking" with 24kGoldn. 

Upon its release, it received generally positive reviews from music critics, with many praising the overall production and Mabel's new direction, while others were more critical of the lyrical content. Despite the moderate success of its singles, the album debuted at number two on the UK Albums Chart, becoming her highest charting album to date.

Background
In February 2021, Mabel posted a snippet of a song and screenshots of fan messages about her second studio album on Instagram. In June 2021, Mabel posted a video on her social media containing a series of shots of her recording, performing and filming two music videos, which ended up being those of the first two singles from the album, "Let Them Know" and "Good Luck". The album's title was hinted at the end of the music video for "Let Them Know" and at the beginning of the music video for "Good Luck".​ Mabel officially announced the album on May 27, 2022.

Singles
The album's lead single, "Let Them Know", was released on 18 June 2021. The song debuted at number 38 on the UK Singles Chart and it eventually peaked at number 19.

"Good Luck" a collaboration with English DJ Jax Jones and Swedish electronic music duo Galantis was released as the second track from the album on 18 March 2022.

"Overthinking" which features American rapper and singer 24kGoldn, was released as the third single off the album on 20 May 2022.

Promotional singles 
"Let Love Go" featuring American rapper Lil Tecca and "Crying on the Dance Floor" were released as promotional singles on 29 June and 12 July 2022, respectively. On 18 July 2022, Mabel released a surprise music video for the song "LOL".

Other songs 
The collaborations "I Wish" with Joel Corry and "Deal or No Deal" with A1 x J1 were released respectively in October 2021 and July 2022, being subsequently added to the streaming versions of the album.

Critical reception

About Last Night... received generally positive reviews from music critics. At Metacritic, which assigns a normalised rating out of 100 to reviews from mainstream publications, the album received a weighted average score of 72, based on seven reviews. Elly Watson of DIY wrote that the album "boldly celebrates ballroom and dance culture", with "each song feel[ing] like you're wandering through a different room in a nightclub" and mixing "disco, dance, pop and R&B elements" while exploring "the highs and lows of the best night out of your life, and Mabel is the perfect party guide".

Writing for The Line of Best Fit, Dave Russell found the album does not "add much of value beyond what we hear" in "Let Them Know". Although finding Mabel to be a talented singer, the album is "almost completely devoid of charisma, uniqueness or nerve" and "smothered under the weight of generic, radio-pandering production and derivative genre cosplay" with "lyrics that are vague to the point of meaninglessness". NME contributor Hannah Mylrea gave the album four out of five stars, observing that "'About Last Night...' leaves you with your ears ringing, hooks stuck in your head and a healthy dose of dancefloor catharsis that'll make you feel lighter."

Commercial performance 
About Last Night… debuted at two on the UK Albums Chart, becoming Mabel's highest charting album to date, outpeaking her debut studio album High Expectations, which peaked at three, one position lower. Elsewhere, the album debuted at four on the Scottish Albums Chart, becoming her highest charting album there, and debuted at 39 on the Irish Albums Chart.

Track listing

Notes
  signifies an additional producer
  signifies a co-producer
  signifies a vocal producer
 The vinyl version of the album includes the solo versions of "Let Love Go" (3:28) and "Overthinking" (2:47).
 On physical copies of the album "LOL" is credited as a bonus track.

Personnel
Musicians

 Mabel – vocals (all tracks), background vocals (3, 11)
 MNEK – background vocals (1, 14); bass, drums, keyboards, programming, synthesizer (4, 5, 12); vocal arrangement (5)
 Tre Jean-Marie – keyboards (1, 4, 5, 8, 12); bass, programming, synthesizer (1, 4, 5, 12); 5-string banjo (4), drums (4, 5, 12)
 Nayla Nyassa – piano, synthesizer (1)
 Rosie Danvers – strings (1, 2, 4, 7, 12), cello (19)
 Anton Göransson – bass (2, 8); drums, keyboards, programming, synthesizer (2)
 Jordan Riley – bass (2, 8, 12), drums (2, 12), keyboards (2, 12), programming (2, 7, 12), strings (2, 7), synthesizer (2)
 Juri Uchishiba – strings (2)
 Raye – background vocals (3)
 SG Lewis – programming, synthesizer (3, 8); bass, drums, keyboards (3)
 Hayley Yum – background vocals (4, 5)
 Myra Mwang'ombe – background vocals (5)
 Jax Jones – programming (6)
 Neave Applebaum – brass band (8); keyboards, programming (14)
 Lil Tecca – vocals (8)
 24kGoldn – vocals (9, 18)
 Oscar Görres – background vocals, bass, drums, guitar, keyboards, percussion, programming (11)
 Harlee – background vocals (14)
 No No – background vocals (14)
 Lewis Thompson – keyboards, programming (14)
 Joel Corry – programming (14)
 Rob Harvey – whistle (14)
 Kelly Barnes – additional vocals (15)
 Hal Ritson – keyboards, programming (15)
 Michele Balduzzi – keyboards, programming (15)
 Richard Adlam – keyboards, programming (15)
 A1 – vocals (15)
 J1 – vocals (15)
 Mike Hough – background vocals (16, 17, 19)
 Victoria Akintola – background vocals (16, 17, 19)
 Thomas Totten – guitar (16, 17)
 Ashton Miranda – piano (16, 17, 19)
 Meghan Cassidy – viola (19)
 Jenny Sacha – violin (19)
 Zara Benyounes – violin (19)

Technical

 Stuart Hawkes – mastering (1–13, 16–19)
 Kevin Grainger – mastering, mixing (14)
 JRocs – mastering, mixing (15)
 Phil Tan – mixing (1, 2, 4, 5, 7, 12)
 Josh Gudwin – mixing (3)
 Mark Ralph – mixing (6, 8)
 Mark "Spike" Stent – mixing (9, 10, 13, 18)
 Serban Ghenea – mixing (11)
 Cameron Gower Poole – mixing (16, 17, 19), engineering (9, 18)
 SG Lewis – engineering (3, 8)
 Nick Mac – engineering (9, 18)
 Mikkel S. Eriksen – engineering (9, 10, 18)
 Tor Erik Hermansen – engineering (9, 18)
 John Hanes – engineering, mix engineering (11)
 Lewis Thompson – engineering (14)
 Neave Applebaum – engineering (14)
 Isabel Gracefield – engineering (19)
 Bill Zimmerman – mix engineering (1, 2, 4, 5, 7, 12), mixing assistance (13)
 Emre Ramazanoglu – immersive mix engineering (16–18)
 Oscar Görres – recording arrangement (11)
 Heidi Wang – mixing assistance (3)
 Matt Wolach – mixing assistance (9, 13, 18)
 Michael Freeman – mixing assistance (10)
 Bryce Bordone – mixing assistance (11)
 Thomas Warren – engineering assistance (9, 10, 18)

Charts

Release history

References 

2022 albums
Mabel (singer) albums
Polydor Records albums
Albums produced by SG Lewis
Albums produced by Stargate